Lauda may refer to:

 Lauda (song), a type of medieval and Renaissance Italian song
 Lauda (airline), a low-cost airline formerly known as Laudamotion
 Lauda Air, a defunct airline that became part of Austrian Airlines

Places
 Lauda, Warmian-Masurian Voivodeship, a village in northern Poland
 Lauda, a borough of the city of Lauda-Königshofen, Baden-Württemberg, Germany

People with the name

 Brittany Lauda (born 1993), U.S. voice actress
 Ernst Lauda (1859 - 1932), Austrian engineer and father of Hans Lauda
 Hans Lauda (1896 - 1974), Austrian industrialist and grandfather of Niki Lauda
 Jan Lauda, Czech sculptor instructor of Arpád Račko
 Mathias Lauda (born 1981), Austrian race car driver, son of Niki Lauda
 Niki Lauda (1949–2019), Austrian former Formula 1 racing driver, father of Mathias Lauda
 Vladislav Lauda (born 1955), Czech footballer